Statistics in Biosciences is a peer-reviewed academic journal published by Springer Science+Business Media. It is the official journal of the International Chinese Statistical Association. It publishes three issues a year on the development and application of statistical methods and their interface with other quantitative methods, such as computational and mathematical methods, in biological and life science, health science, and biopharmaceutical and biotechnological science. The journal publishes scientific papers in four sections: original articles, case studies and practice articles, review articles, and commentaries.

Abstracting and indexing 
Statistics in Biosciences is abstracted and indexed in the Emerging Sources Citation Index, Research Papers in Economics, SCImago Journal Rank, Scopus, among others.

External links

References 

Statistics journals
Publications established in 2009
Springer Science+Business Media academic journals
English-language journals